Frederick George Slessor (1831–1905) was a British railway engineer who worked in England, India, South Africa, and continental Europe.

Early life 
Slessor was born in 1831 in Sidmouth, Devon, England to Major General John Henry Slessor. He attended the Sherborne School and later trained as civil engineer as a pupil of M. W. Peniston M. Inst. C.E.

Career 
In December 1874, following nomination by Sir Charles Hutton Gregory, he was appointed by Cape Government Railways, first as Chief Officer of Surveys and Resident Engineer, and then as Chief Resident Engineer of the Eastern system. After 16 years' service at the Cape he retired on a
pension and returned to Britain.

Alicedale, a village in the Albany district, was named after his wife, Alice Slessor, who died in Queenstown, Eastern Cape, in September 1882.

Slessor died on 15 October 1905 in Somerset, England.

Publications 
  with J D Tilney

Notes

References

See also 
Guybon Atherstone
South African locomotive history

External links 
 Drawings for the construction of Weymouth pier
 Frederick George Slessor on ancestry.com 

19th-century British engineers
British railway civil engineers
1831 births
1905 deaths
People from Sidmouth
People educated at Sherborne School